"One and One" is a song written by Billy Steinberg, Rick Nowels and Marie-Claire D'Ubaldo. The song was performed by Edyta Górniak. It was covered by Robert Miles (feat. Maria Nayler) in 1996.

Edyta Górniak version

The song was first recorded in 1996 by Polish singer Edyta Górniak. However, her version of the song was not released until 1997, when it appeared on her second album which also was her first international album, Edyta Górniak (1997). The song was released as a single in Japan in 1997 and internationally in 1999. The featured live version of "When You Come Back to Me" was recorded on 21 October 1998 in Lisbon, Portugal by Radio RFM at the Lisbon showcase.

Track listing
 CD single
 "One & One" (3:39)
 "When You Come Back to Me" (Live in Portugal) (4:47)

 French single
 "One & One" (3:22)
 "I Don't Know What's On your Mind" (3:58)

 German maxi single "One & One" (3:22)
 "Under Her Spell" (4:13)
 "When You Come Back to Me" (Live in Portugal) (4:47)
 "One & One" (SuperChumbo's High Octane Mix) (6:43)

 Japanese maxi single "One & One" (3:22)
 "Coming Back to Love" (4:03)
 "Never Will I" (4:08)

Music video

The accompanying music video for "One & One" includes scenes from the music video for Anything, some new scenes and private shots.

Personnel
 Backing Vocals: Edyta Gorniak
 Producer: Christopher Neil
 Engineer, Mixed By: Simon Hurrell
 Assistant engineer: Gareth Ashton, Neil Tucker, Robert Catermole
 Spanish guitar: Hugh Burns, John Themis
 Keyboards, Bass, Drum programming: Steve Pigott
 Written by: Billy Steinberg, Marie-Claire D'Ubaldo, Rick Nowels

Charts

Release history
 UK: 4 November 1996
 Germany: 8 March 1999

Robert Miles version

"One and One" was covered by Italian electronic dance musician Robert Miles featuring English singer Maria Nayler and released on 4 November 1996 from his debut album, Dreamland (1996). It was Miles' second number one on the US Billboard Dance Club Songs chart, and the single also peaked at number one in Belgium (Flanders), Israel, Italy, Lithuania, Romania, and Scotland.

Background
Miles is known by some collectors of CD singles for the quotes he includes on his jewel case inserts, succinct expressions of what he was attempting to communicate in writing and producing the song. About "One and One", Miles wrote:
...Sometimes, you don't even have the time to realize what is happening to your life,that it has already happened...the world moves too fast...let's recapture the essence of time."

Critical reception
AllMusic editor Jose F. Promis described the song as a "magical" and "gorgeous, touching, dreamy song, featuring tender vocals by Maria Nayler, which remains one of the most sincere dance songs of its era." Larry Flick from Billboard wrote that Nayler "brings an appropriately ethereal quality to the cut's warm and pillowy instrumentation. She coos and whispers atop a stream of piano lines that are similar to the infectious tinkling on "Children", while a quietly insinuating dance beat pushes along at a disco-like pace." Dave Sholin from the Gavin Report commented, "Well, no one can argue that the words are better this time around. In all seriousness, Miles disproved the long-held belief that Top 40 programmers will not play instrumentals. They do play hits, and after overcoming some initial resistance, "Children" proved itself to be a smash here just as it had been around the world. This followup, which does feature a vocal, has a Euro feel, which B96-Chicago MD Erik Bradley describes as hypnotic. After two weeks of spins, he reports "a ton of calls from women. I think this will be one of the big records for fall." A reviewer from Music Week rated it four out of five, complimenting Nayler's "sweet Madonna-ish vocals [that] combine with a dreamy soundscape from Miles. It's enigmatic — and another big hit."

Chart performance
"One and One" was very successful on the charts all over the world and remains one of Robert Miles' biggest hits. In Europe, it peaked at number-one in Belgium, Italy, Lithuania, Romania and Scotland, as well as on the Eurochart Hot 100. The single made it to the Top 10 also in Austria, Czech Republic, Denmark, Finland, Germany, Hungary, Iceland, Ireland, Norway, Sweden, Switzerland and the United Kingdom. In the latter, it reached number three in its sixth week at the UK Singles Chart, on 15 December 1996. Additionally, "One and One" was a Top 20 hit in France and the Netherlands. Outside Europe, it hit number-one on the Billboard Hot Dance Club Play chart in the United States, number seven on the RPM Dance/Urban chart in Canada and number 56 in Australia. The single earned a gold record in Belgium, Germany, Norway, Sweden and the UK.

Music video
The music video for "One & One" was directed by Irish filmmaker Michael Geoghegan.

Track listings

 12" maxi, Germany "One & One" (original club version) — 6:30
 "One & One" (David Morales club mix) — 9:00
 "One & One" (Joe T. Vannelli light mix) — 7:34
 "One & One" (David Morales one dub) — 11:40

 12-inch maxi, Italy "One & One" (club version) — 6:30
 "4US — 7:41
 "One & One" (Joe T. Vannelli SLK mix) — 9:11
 "One & One" (Joe T. Vannelli Radio light mix) — 4:05

 CD single "One & One" (radio version) — 4:00
 "One & One" (club version) — 6:30

 CD maxi, Germany "One & One" (Quivvers Amytiville vocal) — 9:43
 "One & One" (Quivvers Amytiville dub) — 8:25
 "One & One" (David Morales journey mix) — 10:00
 "One & One" (Joe T. Vannelli SLK mix) — 8:50

 CD maxi, Italy "One & One" (radio version) — 4:00
 "One & One" (radio without the beat) — 4:00
 "4US" — 7:41
 "One & One" (Quivvers Amytiville dub) — 8:25
 "One & One" (David Morales journey mix) — 10:00
 "One & One" (Joe T. Vannelli radio light mix) — 4:05
 "One & One" (Joe T. Vannelli SLK mix) — 8:50

 CD maxi, Japan "One & One" (radio version) — 4:00
 "One & One" (club version) — 6:30
 "One & One" (David Morales club mix) — 9:00
 "One & One" (Joe T. Vannelli's light mix) — 7:34
 "One & One" (Quivvers Amytiville vox mix) — 9:43

 CD maxi, Netherlands "One & One" (radio version) — 4:00
 "One & One" (Joe T. Vannelli light radio mix) — 4:05
 "One & One" (club version) — 6:30
 "4US" — 7:41
 "One & One" (Quivver's Amytiville vox mix) — 9:42
 "One & One" (David Morales journey mix) — 9:56

 CD maxi, UK "One & One" (radio version) — 4:00
 "One & One" (club version) — 6:30
 "4Us" — 7:41

 CD maxi - Remixes'''
 "One & One" (extended album version) — 6:30
 "One & One" (David Morales club mix) — 8:58
 "One & One" (Joe T. Vanelli light mix) — 7:32
 "One & One" (David Morales journey mix) — 10:00

Charts

Weekly charts

Year-end charts

Certifications

Release history

References

1996 singles
1997 singles
1999 singles
Electronic songs
Ultratop 50 Singles (Flanders) number-one singles
European Hot 100 Singles number-one singles
Robert Miles songs
Song recordings produced by Christopher Neil
Songs written by Billy Steinberg
Songs written by Rick Nowels
1996 songs
Number-one singles in Israel
Number-one singles in Italy
Number-one singles in Romania
Number-one singles in Scotland
House music songs
Music videos directed by Michael Geoghegan
Songs written by Marie-Claire D'Ubaldo
Arista Records singles
Deconstruction Records singles